Nanga Pinoh Airport  is an airport in Nanga Pinoh, the capital city of Melawi Regency, Kapuas Raya, Indonesia.

Airlines and destinations

The following airlines offer direct flights from Nanga Pinoh

References

Airports in West Kalimantan